in the province of Shinano. He was the eldest son of Ogasawara Nagakiyo and the rightful inheritor of the art of Ogasawara-ryu archery and mounted archery.

His wife was a daughter of Takeda Tomonobu. Some of his children were Ogasawara Nagafusa, Akazawa Kiyotsune, Tamura Nagazane, Ueno Morinaga, and Akazato Nagamura among others.

References
https://web.archive.org/web/20051126181923/http://members.aol.com/uchuujin/mysenzo3.html 

1179 births
1247 deaths
Ogasawara clan